The Port of Belize is the premier port facility in Belize. It is the port of Belize City, handling containers, breakbulk, tankers, ro-ro cargo, as well as cruise ships in the anchorage.

References

External links

Populated places in Belize District
Belize
Belize